The 2001 Detroit mayoral election took place on November 7, 2001. It saw the election of Kwame Kilpatrick.

At the age of 31, Kilpatrick became the youngest mayor ever elected in the city's history.

Background
On April 7, 2001, incumbent mayor Dennis Archer made the surprise announcement that he would be running for a third term.

Candidates

Ran
Twenty-one candidates ran.<ref name="appearstohavewon">{{cite web |title=Kilpatrick appears to have won Detroit mayors race |url=https://www.michigandaily.com/uncategorized/kilpatrick-appears-have-won-detroit-mayors-race/ |publisher=The Michigan Daily |agency=The Associated Press |access-date=31 July 2021 |language=en |date=7 November 2001}}</ref>

Advanced to general election
Gil Hill, Detroit City Council president and former chief of the Detroit Police Department
Kwame Kilpatrick, minority leader of the Michigan House of Representatives

Eliminated in primary
Charles Beckham, former director of the Detroit Water and Sewerage Department and former member of the Detroit Board of Water Commissioners
Thomas E. Binion
Raymond Edward Boatwright
Clifford Brookins II
William C. Brooks, former United States assistant secretary of labor for the Employment Standards Administration, former member of the Social Security Advisory Board, former chairman of the Detroit Public Schools Board of Education, former General Motors executive
Angelo S. Brown
Delonda A. Browner
Charles C. Costa
James Del Rio, former judge of the Recorder's Court
Freddie L. Fulson
John E. George Jr.
Joe Harris, auditor general of Detroit since 1995
Osborne G. Hart
Nicholas Hood III, former member of the Detroit City Council (1993–2001)
Raymond Lyle Jr.
Eileen Martin
James Thomas III
Roosevelt Williams
Leonard Young

Declined to run
Geoffrey Feiger, attorney and Democratic nominee for governor of Michigan in 1998
Freman Hendrix, deputy mayor of Detroit
Sharon McPhail, candidate in the 1993 Detroit mayoral election
Benny Napoleon, chief of the Detroit Police Department

Primary
Campaigning
The nonpartisan primary election was held on September 1, 2001

Hill had initially supported Kilpatrick for mayor, before reversing and launching his own campaign.

The primary election campaign was regarded to have been largely polite in character. Hill and Kilpatrick, in particular, were noted to be respectful in their regard of each other during the primary, unusually so for a Detroit mayoral election.

Hill was endorsed by the American Federation of State, County and Municipal Employees and United Auto Workers.

Outgoing mayor Dennis Archer did not endorse any candidate. Also declining to endorse a candidate was governor John Engler.

Kilpatrick made a number of gaffes that were seen as hampering his momentum among parts of the electorate. One gaffe was remarking, while on a religious cable television program, that he did not want his sons exposed to a "homosexual lifestyle". Kilpatrick also faced some controversy, including reporting by the Detroit Free Press'' that he had solicited a $50,000 contribution to his Kilpatrick Civic Fund from the president of a tax-funded homeless shelter, as well as the management arm of the homeless shelter. The donation was used for voter education in advance of the November 2000 elections.

Hill was better-known than Kilpatrick.

For much of the campaign, Hill had a strong lead in polls. He had held a strong lead in polls as early as May. Polling, for much of the campaign, showed him to have massive leads over his competitors. Hill was regarded as the clear front-runner until the last weeks of the primary campaign. Contrarily, Killpatrick was, earlier in the campaign, seen as a long-shot, registering as low as 16% support in polls at one point. Approximately a week prior to the election, a poll was released showing Kilpatrick with a 10% lead over Hill. By the end of the primary campaign, Hill and Kilpatrick were well-established in recent polls as the front-runners to advance to the general election.

In the lead up to the election, it was seen as the most energized primary since the 1973 mayoral election. The primary, however, was overshadowed by the September 11th terrorist attacks on the United States, which took place the same day. Turnout for the primary wound up being one of the lowest in the city's history, with just 22% of eligible voters participating.

Polls

Results
Gil Hill and Kwame Kilpatrick were the top-two finishers, and therefore advanced to the general election.

Kilpatrick received 51% of the vote, while Hill received 34% of the vote. Turnout was 22%.

Exit polling indicated that Kilpatrick ultimately led in support among most demographic groups. Hill, however, did lead with older voters.

Kilpatrick's very strong performance was a surprise, while Hill was seen as underperforming.

General election

Campaigning
While, due to his strong performance in the primary, Kilpatrick was initially seen as a very strong front-runner for the general election, later polls began to show a close race in the general election.

As in the primary, outgoing mayor Dennis Archer did not endorse either candidate.

Polls

Results
Kilpatrick defeated Hill 54% to 46%.

Notes

References

Detroit
Detroit
2001
mayoral election